Franklin Vincent Reno (14 May 1911 – 1 May 1990) was a mathematician and civilian employee at the United States Army Aberdeen Proving Ground in Maryland in the 1930s. Reno was a member of the "Karl group" of Soviet spies which was being handled by Whittaker Chambers until 1938. Reno confessed in late 1948 to his espionage activities on behalf of the GRU. He is listed as number "118th" in the Gorsky Memo. Reno was sentenced to three years in prison. 

Reno was born in Salt Lake City, to a stock raiser and his wife from "Reno, Idaho" (likely Reno Ranch, Idaho). Reno graduated from Colorado University with "top honors" in mathematics in 1932. While doing graduate studies in astronomy at the University of Virginia in 1935 he joined the Communist Party under the name "Lance Clark." He then took a job at the national office of the Works Progress Administration, after which he resigned to become a Communist Party organizer in Maryland. He began working at Aberdeen Proving Ground in 1937 and continued there until his resignation in 1949. In 1945 he was "given the war department's gold medal for devising a complicated bomb table." He worked on the Norden bombsight and was said to have passed information on this device to Alger Hiss. In 1952 he pleaded guilty to not disclosing his Communist Party when he was being screened for the Aberdeen job. He was sentenced to three years in federal prison.

Reno also collaborated with Edward J. McShane of the University of Virginia and John L. Kelley of the University of California on a book called Exterior Ballistics. The judge gave Reno a month's delay in reporting for his sentence  so he could finish his work on the book. 

Reno died in 1990 at age 79.

See also

 List of American spies
 John Abt
 Whittaker Chambers
 Noel Field
 Harold Glasser
 John Herrmann
 Alger Hiss
 Donald Hiss
 Victor Perlo
 J. Peters
 Ward Pigman
 Lee Pressman
 Julian Wadleigh
 Harold Ware
 Nathaniel Weyl
 Harry Dexter White
 Nathan Witt

References

Sources

American spies for the Soviet Union
Espionage in the United States
1911 births
1990 deaths
American mathematicians
University of Colorado alumni